Ledwith is a surname. Notable people with the surname include:

Anthony Ledwith (1933–2015), British chemist
Martin Ledwith, British actor and acting coach
Micheál Ledwith, Irish Roman Catholic priest 
Mike Ledwith (1874–1929), American baseball player
Thomas A. Ledwith (1840–1898), American lawyer and politician